Ryan Crowley (born 5 March 1984) is a former professional Australian rules footballer who played for the Fremantle Football Club and the Essendon Football Club in the Australian Football League (AFL). He played as a midfielder and specialised in a tagging role.

AFL career
Crowley was first drafted by Fremantle in 2002 with selection 55 at the national draft.  At the end of 2004, having only played WAFL football for Subiaco, he was delisted.  However the club gave Crowley a second chance and re-selected him with their 3rd pick in the rookie draft. Good form with Subiaco in 2005 led to his elevation to the senior list when both Robert Haddrill and his replacement Michael Warren were placed on the long term injury list.

His continued good form in the second half of the 2005 season including 4 goals against Carlton at the MCG saw Ryan elevated to the senior list for the 2006 season. Early in the 2006 season, Ryan got a heavy blow to the face during a shepherd from Byron Pickett, and received a broken cheekbone. Crowley continued to improve throughout the 2007 season, having gathered 319 disposals in 19 games and earning a regular spot in the Fremantle midfield as a winger/onballer who can kick goals.

Conversion to a tagger
In 2008, however, he developed into a defensive midfielder or tagger and notoriously played on opposition stars such as Gary Ablett, Jr. and Daniel Kerr.  He finished the year well, coming equal fifth in Fremantle's fairest and best award, the Doig Medal.

In 2009 Crowley injured his foot in the Round 6 Western Derby and was ruled out for between three months and the entire season.  He didn't return to the Fremantle side until the first round of 2010. He played the first 16 games of the season, before injuring his knee against Melbourne, missing the next six games.  He returned for Fremantle's two finals, after proving his fitness in a dominant display in the WAFL for Subiaco, kicking seven goals.

He continued to nullify the opponent's best midfielder each week and won the Doig Medal in 2012 as Fremantle's best and fairest player. In 2013 he was suggested as being worthy of selection in the All-Australian team, but was overlooked.

Suspension for taking banned substance
In March 2015, it was revealed that Crowley had tested positive to a banned substance after Fremantle's Round 17, 2014 match against Greater Western Sydney. Crowley had accepted a provisional suspension in September 2014. The banned substance has not been named, but is thought to be from a painkiller that was not prescribed by the club doctor. In June 2015, the AFL Tribunal suspended Crowley for twelve months; the suspension was backdated to the start of his provisional suspension, and he became eligible to play again on 25 September 2015. He was subsequently delisted in October.

Essendon

Statistics

|- style="background-color: #EAEAEA"
! scope="row" style="text-align:center" | 2005
|
| 15 || 12 || 10 || 4 || 98 || 45 || 143 || 53 || 19 || 0.8 || 0.3 || 8.2 || 3.8 || 11.9 || 4.4 || 1.6
|-
! scope="row" style="text-align:center" | 2006
|
| 15 || 19 || 20 || 8 || 179 || 104 || 283 || 103 || 29 || 1.0 || 0.4 || 9.4 || 5.5 || 14.9 || 5.4 || 1.5
|- style="background-color: #EAEAEA"
! scope="row" style="text-align:center" | 2007
|
| 15 || 19 || 13 || 11 || 189 || 130 || 319 || 85 || 44 || 0.7 || 0.6 || 10.0 || 6.8 || 16.8 || 4.5 || 2.3
|-
! scope="row" style="text-align:center" | 2008
|
| 15 || 22 || 11 || 10 || 216 || 135 || 351 || 106 || 77 || 0.5 || 0.4 || 9.8 || 6.1 || 16.0 || 4.8 || 3.5
|- style="background-color: #EAEAEA"
! scope="row" style="text-align:center" | 2009
|
| 15 || 6 || 4 || 3 || 47 || 23 || 70 || 23 || 16 || 0.7 || 0.5 || 7.8 || 3.8 || 11.7 || 3.8 || 2.7
|-
! scope="row" style="text-align:center" | 2010
|
| 15 || 18 || 15 || 8 || 106 || 133 || 239 || 49 || 75 || 0.8 || 0.4 || 5.9 || 7.4 || 13.3 || 2.7 || 4.2
|- style="background-color: #EAEAEA"
! scope="row" style="text-align:center" | 2011
|
| 15 || 19 || 13 || 10 || 129 || 115 || 244 || 60 || 57 || 0.7 || 0.5 || 6.8 || 6.0 || 12.8 || 3.2 || 3.0
|-
! scope="row" style="text-align:center" | 2012
|
| 15 || 24 || 12 || 16 || 208 || 147 || 355 || 78 || 88 || 0.5 || 0.7 || 8.7 || 6.1 || 14.8 || 3.2 || 3.7
|- style="background-color: #EAEAEA"
! scope="row" style="text-align:center" | 2013
|
| 15 || 25 || 9 || 10 || 192 || 178 || 370 || 80 || 74 || 0.4 || 0.4 || 7.7 || 7.1 || 14.8 || 3.2 || 3.0
|-
! scope="row" style="text-align:center" | 2014
|
| 15 || 24 || 9 || 5 || 198 || 151 || 349 || 74 || 66 || 0.4 || 0.2 || 8.2 || 6.3 || 14.5 || 3.1 || 2.8
|- style="background-color: #EAEAEA"
! scope="row" style="text-align:center" | 2015
|
| 15 || 0 || — || — || — || — || — || — || — || — || — || — || — || — || — || —
|-
! scope="row" style="text-align:center" | 2016
|
| 51 || 8 || 2 || 3 || 74 || 67 || 141 || 36 || 14 || 0.3 || 0.4 || 9.3 || 8.4 || 17.6 || 4.5 || 1.8
|- class="sortbottom"
! colspan=3| Career
! 196
! 118
! 88
! 1636
! 1228
! 2864
! 747
! 559
! 0.6
! 0.4
! 8.3
! 6.3
! 14.6
! 3.8
! 2.9
|}

References

External links

Ryan Crowley's profile page on the Official WAFL Website

1984 births
Living people
Essendon Football Club players
Fremantle Football Club players
Australian rules footballers from Victoria (Australia)
Calder Cannons players
Subiaco Football Club players
Doig Medal winners
Doping cases in Australian rules football
Swan Districts Football Club players
Australia international rules football team players